Don is a masculine given name in the Irish language and a short form of another masculine given name in the English language. The Irish name is derived from the Irish donn; the name can either mean "brown", or "chief", "noble". The Irish name is a variant spelling of Donn. The English name is unrelated to the Irish name; this name is a short form of the given name Donald or Donovan. Pet forms of this English name include: Donnie and Donny. It can also be a surname, also derived from "brown". It is a common name in the English language.

See also
 List of people named Donald

References

English-language masculine given names
Irish-language masculine given names
English masculine given names